Christal Henner is an American bridge player and a World Life Master in the Open rankings of the World Bridge Federation. Henner finished second in the Rosenblum Cup World Championship in 2006 in Verona, Italy and won five North American Bridge Championships.

Bridge accomplishments

Wins

 North American Bridge Championships (5)
 Jacoby Open Swiss Teams (1) 2003 
 Vanderbilt (1) 2007 
 Mitchell Board-a-Match Teams (1) 2004 
 Roth Open Swiss Teams (2) 2005, 2006

Runners-up

 Rosenblum Cup (1) 2006 
 North American Bridge Championships
 Jacoby Open Swiss Teams (1) 2004 
 Reisinger (1) 2010

References

External links
 

American contract bridge players
Living people
Place of birth missing (living people)
Year of birth missing (living people)